= Ivailo, Pazardzhik Province =

Coordinates: 42.2167°N 24.3333°E

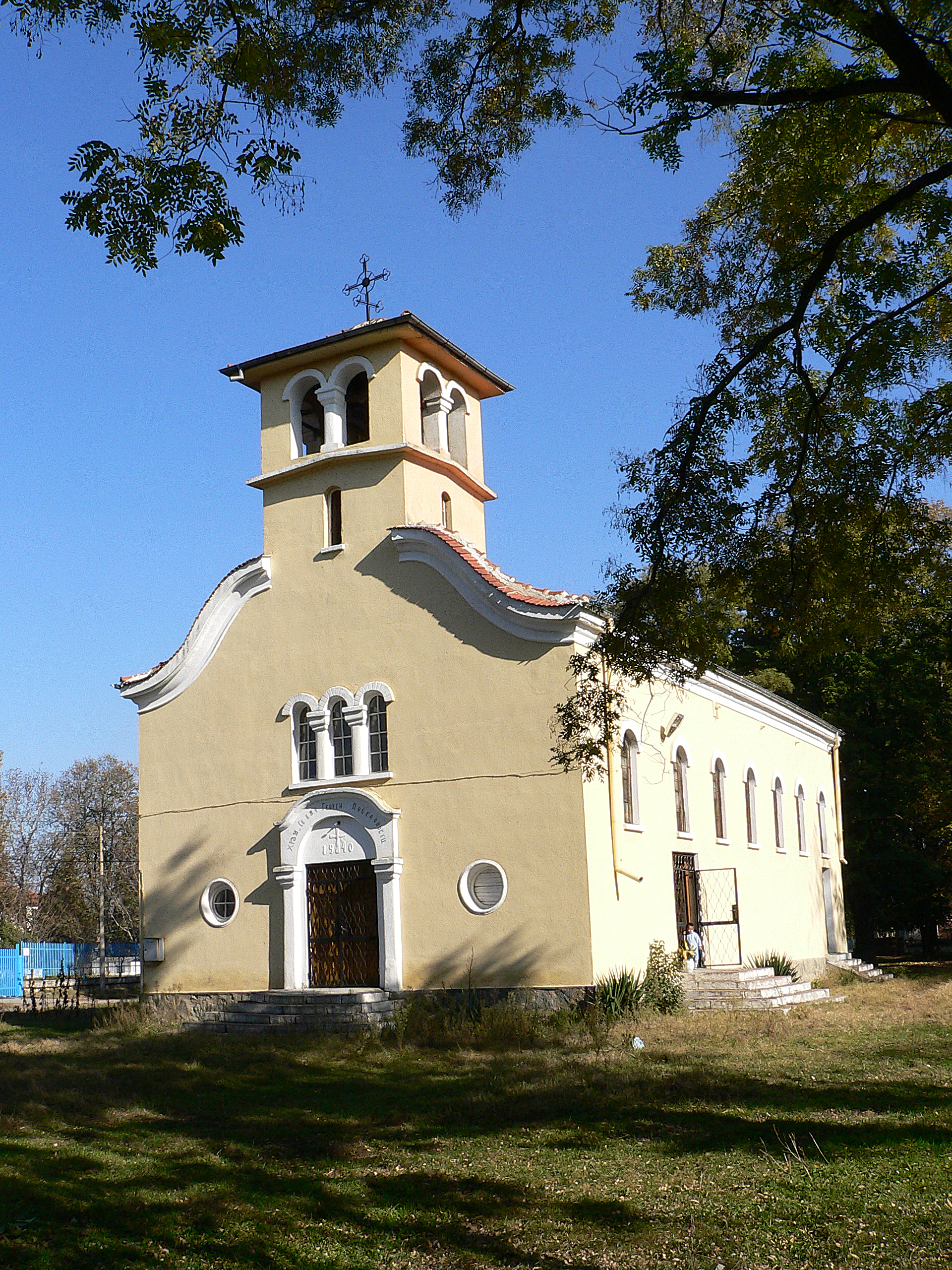
Saint George church in Ivaylo

Ivailo is a small village just near the city of Pazardzhik. It would take approximately four minutes to commute between the two.
